Cardiff is a settlement in inland Taranaki, in the western North Island of New Zealand. It is located five kilometres southwest of Stratford close to Egmont National Park.

Gallery

Further reading

General historical works

Business history

Cardiff was one of the constituent dairy co-operatives (the others being Eltham, Stratford, and Normanby) who combined to form the Taranaki Co-operative Dairy Co. Ltd. in 1965. See records of the Cardiff Dairy Company (A392) /

People

Architectural plans for a house for Cardiff resident, Fred Frethey (and dating from 1910) are held within  in New Plymouth. See  

An oral history resource relating to Diana Humphries (who formerly taught at Cardiff School) is held within  in New Plymouth. See  

 Former Stratford District mayor, David Walter, has conducted a number of oral history interviews with people within that broad geographical area. These are preserved as mp3 files on twelve CDs held within  in New Plymouth. The sixth CD of this collection contains a recording of Henry Johnson speaking about his life and times, in England and Cardiff. See

Schools

Stratford District, New Zealand
Populated places in Taranaki